Hřibiny-Ledská is a municipality in Rychnov nad Kněžnou District in the Hradec Králové Region of the Czech Republic. It has about 400 inhabitants.

Administrative parts

The municipality is made up of villages of Hřibiny, Ledská and Paseky. Ledská consists of urbanistically separated parts of Velká Ledská and Malá Ledská.

History
The first written mention of Paseky is from 1387, of Ledská is from 1442, and of Hřibiny is from 1544. Until 1960, Hřibiny and Ledská were two separate municipalities, and Paseky was a part of Hřibiny. In 1960, the municipalities were merged.

References

External links

Villages in Rychnov nad Kněžnou District